Somanniathelphusa lacuvita is a species of crab that belongs to the family Gecarcinucidae. The species was first found in Cambodia. The crab is found in rice paddies. When undercooked, it can transmit lung flukes to humans.

References

Crustaceans described in 1995
Fauna of Cambodia
Gecarcinucidae
Edible crustaceans